Monostiolum is a genus of sea snails, marine gastropod mollusks in the family Pisaniidae.

Species
Species within the genus Monostiolum include:
 Monostiolum atlanticum (Coelho, Matthews & Cardoso, 1970)
 Monostiolum auratum Watters & Finlay, 1989
 Monostiolum crebristriatus (Carpenter, 1856)
 Monostiolum fumosum Watters, 2009
 Monostiolum harryleei Garcia, 2006
 Monostiolum nigricostatum (Reeve, 1846)
 Monostiolum nocturnum Watters, 2009
 Monostiolum pictum (Reeve, 1844)
 Monostiolum rosewateri Watters & Finlay, 1989
 Monostiolum simonei Watters, 2016
 Monostiolum tessellatum (Reeve, 1844)
Species brought into synonymy
 Monostiolum weberi (Watters, 1983):<ref>{{WRMS species|419976|Monostiolum weberi (Watters, 1983)||26 August 2010}}</ref> synonym of Bailya weberi (Watters, 1983)

References

 Watters G.T. & Finlay C.J. (1989) A revision of the western Atlantic Recent species of the genus Monostiolum Dall, 1904, and Bailya (Parabailya) new subgenus (Gastropoda: Buccinidae).'' The Veliger 32(1): 47-59. [3 January 1989] page(s): 55

Pisaniidae